Iulius Andrei Mărginean (born 3 July 2001) is a Romanian professional footballer who plays as a defensive midfielder for  club Novara, on loan from Sassuolo.

Club career

Messina
Andrei made his senior debut for Messina on 12 September 2021, in a 2–1 away loss over Monopoli counting for the Serie C.

Novara
On 4 August 2022, Mărginean was loaned to Novara.

Career statistics

Club

References

External links

2001 births
Living people
People from Zlatna
Romanian footballers
Association football midfielders
Serie C players
U.S. Sassuolo Calcio players
A.C.R. Messina players
Novara F.C. players
Romanian expatriate footballers
Romanian expatriate sportspeople in Italy
Expatriate footballers in Italy
Romania youth international footballers
Romania under-21 international footballers